Jessica Pieri (born 24 April 1997) is an Italian tennis player.

Pieri has a career-high singles ranking of 205 by the WTA, achieved on 28 May 2018. She also has a career-high WTA doubles ranking of 563, reached on 15 July 2019. She has won six ITF singles titles.

Pieri made her WTA Tour debut at the 2019 Palermo Ladies Open where she qualified for the main draw, defeating Laura Pigossi in the final qualifying round.

Grand Slam performance timelines

Singles

ITF Circuit finals

Singles: 11 (6 titles, 5 runner–ups)

References

External links

 
 

1997 births
Living people
Italian female tennis players
21st-century Italian women